Club Industriel de Kamsar is an association football club from Guinea based in Kamsar. They currently play in the Ligue 1 Pro the top tier of Guinean Football.

Current squad

Honours
Guinée Coupe Nationale: 0
Runner-up (3 times): 2004, 2006, 2013

External links

Team profile – soccerway.com

Football clubs in Guinea